This is a list of the bird species recorded in Bangladesh. The avifauna of Bangladesh include a total of 824 species, of which two have been introduced by humans. Fifty-one species are globally threatened.

This list's taxonomic treatment (designation and sequence of orders, families and species) and nomenclature (common and scientific names) follow the conventions of The Clements Checklist of Birds of the World, 2022 edition. The family accounts at the beginning of each heading reflect this taxonomy, as do the species counts found in each family account. Introduced and accidental species are included in the total counts for Bangladesh.

The following tags have been used to highlight several categories. The commonly occurring native species do not fall into any of these categories.

 (A) Accidental - a species that rarely or accidentally occurs in Bangladesh
 (I) Introduced - a species introduced to Bangladesh as a consequence, direct or indirect, of human actions
 (Ex) Extirpated - a species that no longer occurs in Bangladesh although populations exist elsewhere

Ducks, geese, and waterfowl
Order: AnseriformesFamily: Anatidae

Anatidae includes the ducks and most duck-like waterfowl, such as geese and swans. These birds are adapted to an aquatic existence with webbed feet, flattened bills, and feathers that are excellent at shedding water due to an oily coating.

Pheasants, grouse, and allies
Order: GalliformesFamily: Phasianidae

The Phasianidae are a family of terrestrial birds. In general, they are plump (although they vary in size) and have broad, relatively short wings.

Flamingos
Order: PhoenicopteriformesFamily: Phoenicopteridae

Flamingos filter-feed on shellfish and algae. Their oddly shaped beaks are specially adapted to separate mud and silt from the food they consume and, uniquely, are used upside-down.

Greater flamingo, Phoenicopterus roseus

Grebes
Order: PodicipediformesFamily: Podicipedidae

Grebes are small to medium-large freshwater diving birds. They have lobed toes and are excellent swimmers and divers. However, they have their feet placed far back on the body, making them quite ungainly on land.

Little grebe, Tachybaptus ruficollis
Red-necked grebe, Podiceps grisegena (A)
Great crested grebe, Podiceps cristatus
Eared grebe, Podiceps nigricollis (A)

Pigeons and doves
Order: ColumbiformesFamily: Columbidae

Pigeons and doves are stout-bodied birds with short necks and short slender bills with a fleshy cere.

Sandgrouse
Order: PterocliformesFamily: Pteroclidae

Sandgrouse have small, pigeon like heads and necks, but sturdy compact bodies. They have long pointed wings and sometimes tails and a fast direct flight. Flocks fly to watering holes at dawn and dusk. Their legs are feathered down to the toes.

Chestnut-bellied sandgrouse, Pterocles exustus
Painted sandgrouse, Pterocles indicus

Bustards
Order: OtidiformesFamily: Otididae

Bustards are large terrestrial birds mainly associated with dry open country and steppes in the Old World. They are omnivorous and nest on the ground. They walk steadily on strong legs and big toes, pecking for food as they go. They have long broad wings with "fingered" wingtips and striking patterns in flight. Many have interesting mating displays.

Bengal florican, Houbaropsis bengalensis (Ex)
Lesser florican, Sypheotides indicus

Cuckoos
Order: CuculiformesFamily: Cuculidae

The family Cuculidae includes cuckoos, roadrunners and anis. These birds are of variable size with slender bodies, long tails and strong legs.

Frogmouths
Order: CaprimulgiformesFamily: Podargidae

The frogmouths are a group of nocturnal birds related to the nightjars. They are named for their large flattened hooked bill and huge frog-like gape, which they use to take insects.

Hodgson's frogmouth, Batrachostomus hodgsoni

Nightjars and allies
Order: CaprimulgiformesFamily: Caprimulgidae

Nightjars are medium-sized nocturnal birds that usually nest on the ground. They have long wings, short legs and very short bills. Most have small feet, of little use for walking, and long pointed wings. Their soft plumage is camouflaged to resemble bark or leaves.

Great eared-nightjar, Eurostopodus macrotis
Gray nightjar, Caprimulgus jotaka
Sykes's nightjar, Caprimulgus mahrattensis (A)
Large-tailed nightjar, Caprimulgus macrurus
Indian nightjar, Caprimulgus asiaticus
Savanna nightjar, Caprimulgus affinis

Swifts
Order: CaprimulgiformesFamily: Apodidae

Swifts are small birds which spend the majority of their lives flying. These birds have very short legs and never settle voluntarily on the ground, perching instead only on vertical surfaces. Many swifts have long swept-back wings which resemble a crescent or boomerang.

White-rumped needletail, Zoonavena sylvatica (A)
White-throated needletail, Hirundapus caudacutus
Silver-backed needletail, Hirundapus cochinchinensis (A)
Brown-backed needletail, Hirundapus giganteus
Himalayan swiftlet, Aerodramus brevirostris
Alpine swift, Apus melba
Pacific swift, Apus pacificus (A)
Blyth's swift, Apus leuconyx
Little swift, Apus affinis
House swift, Apus nipalensis
Asian palm-swift, Cypsiurus balasiensis

Treeswifts
Order: CaprimulgiformesFamily: Hemiprocnidae

The treeswifts, also called crested swifts, are closely related to the true swifts. They differ from the other swifts in that they have crests, long forked tails and softer plumage.

Crested treeswift, Hemiprocne coronata (A)

Rails, gallinules, and coots
Order: GruiformesFamily: Rallidae

Rallidae is a large family of small to medium-sized birds which includes the rails, crakes, coots and gallinules. Typically they inhabit dense vegetation in damp environments near lakes, swamps or rivers. In general they are shy and secretive birds, making them difficult to observe. Most species have strong legs and long toes which are well adapted to soft uneven surfaces. They tend to have short, rounded wings and to be weak fliers.

Brown-cheeked rail, Rallus indicus
Slaty-breasted rail, Lewinia striata
Spotted crake, Porzana porzana
Eurasian moorhen, Gallinula chloropus
Eurasian coot, Fulica atra
Gray-headed swamphen, Porphyrio poliocephalus
Watercock, Gallicrex cinerea
White-breasted waterhen, Amaurornis phoenicurus
Slaty-legged crake, Rallina eurizonoides
Ruddy-breasted crake, Zapornia fusca
Brown crake, Zapornia akool
Baillon's crake, Zapornia pusilla
Black-tailed crake, Zapornia bicolor

Finfoots
Order: GruiformesFamily: Heliornithidae

Heliornithidae is a small family of tropical birds with webbed lobes on their feet similar to those of grebes and coots.

Masked finfoot, Heliopais personata

Cranes

Order: GruiformesFamily: Gruidae

Cranes are large, long-legged and long-necked birds. Unlike the similar-looking but unrelated herons, cranes fly with necks outstretched, not pulled back. Most have elaborate and noisy courting displays or "dances".

Demoiselle crane, Anthropoides antigone
Sarus crane, Antigone antigone
Common crane, Grus grus (A)

Thick-knees
Order: CharadriiformesFamily: Burhinidae

The stone-curlews are a group of largely tropical waders in the family Burhinidae. They are found worldwide within the tropical zone, with some species also breeding in temperate Europe and Australia. They are medium to large waders with strong black or yellow-black bills, large yellow eyes and cryptic plumage. Despite being classed as waders, most species have a preference for arid or semi-arid habitats.

Indian thick-knee, Burhinus indicus
Great thick-knee, Esacus recurvirostris

Stilts and avocets
Order: CharadriiformesFamily: Recurvirostridae

Recurvirostridae is a family of large wading birds, which includes the avocets and stilts. The avocets have long legs and long up-curved bills. The stilts have extremely long legs and long, thin, straight bills. .

Black-winged stilt, Himantopus himantopus
Pied avocet, Recurvirostra avosetta

Oystercatchers
Order: CharadriiformesFamily: Haematopodidae

The oystercatchers are large and noisy plover-like birds, with strong bills used for smashing or prising open molluscs.

Eurasian oystercatcher, Haematopus ostralegus (A)

Plovers and lapwings
Order: CharadriiformesFamily: Charadriidae

The family Charadriidae includes the plovers, dotterels and lapwings. They are small to medium-sized birds with compact bodies, short, thick necks and long, usually pointed, wings. They are found in open country worldwide, mostly in habitats near water.

Black-bellied plover, Pluvialis squatarola
Pacific golden-plover, Pluvialis fulva
Northern lapwing, Vanellus vanellus
River lapwing, Vanellus duvaucelii
Yellow-wattled lapwing, Vanellus malabaricus
Gray-headed lapwing, Vanellus cinereus
Red-wattled lapwing, Vanellus indicus
Sociable lapwing, Vanellus gregarius
White-tailed lapwing, Vanellus leucurus
Lesser sand-plover, Charadrius mongolus
Greater sand-plover, Charadrius leschenaultii
Kentish plover, Charadrius alexandrinus
Common ringed plover, Charadrius hiaticula
Long-billed plover, Charadrius placidus (A)
Little ringed plover, Charadrius dubius
Oriental plover, Charadrius veredus (A)

Painted-snipes
Order: CharadriiformesFamily: Rostratulidae

Painted-snipe are short-legged, long-billed birds similar in shape to the true snipes, but more brightly coloured.

Greater painted-snipe, Rostratula benghalensis

Jacanas
Order: CharadriiformesFamily: Jacanidae

The jacanas are a group of tropical waders in the family Jacanidae. They are found throughout the tropics. They are identifiable by their huge feet and claws which enable them to walk on floating vegetation in the shallow lakes that are their preferred habitat.

Pheasant-tailed jacana, Hydrophasianus chirurgus
Bronze-winged jacana, Metopidius indicus

Sandpipers and allies
Order: CharadriiformesFamily: Scolopacidae

Scolopacidae is a large diverse family of small to medium-sized shorebirds including the sandpipers, curlews, godwits, shanks, tattlers, woodcocks, snipes, dowitchers and phalaropes. The majority of these species eat small invertebrates picked out of the mud or soil. Variation in length of legs and bills enables multiple species to feed in the same habitat, particularly on the coast, without direct competition for food.

Buttonquails
Order: CharadriiformesFamily: Turnicidae

The buttonquails are small, drab, running birds which resemble the true quails. The female is the brighter of the sexes and initiates courtship. The male incubates the eggs and tends the young.

Small buttonquail, Turnix sylvatica (Ex)
Yellow-legged buttonquail, Turnix tanki (A)
Barred buttonquail, Turnix suscitator

Crab-plover
Order: CharadriiformesFamily: Dromadidae

The crab-plover is related to the waders, but is the only member of its family. It resembles a plover but has very long grey legs and a strong black bill similar to that of a tern. It has black-and-white plumage, a long neck, partially webbed feet, and a bill designed for eating crabs.

Crab-plover, Dromas ardeola

Pratincoles and coursers
Order: CharadriiformesFamily: Glareolidae

Glareolidae is a family of wading birds comprising the pratincoles, which have short legs, long pointed wings and long forked tails, and the coursers, which have long legs, short wings and long, pointed bills which curve downwards.

Indian courser, Cursorius coromandelicus
Collared pratincole, Glareola pratincola
Oriental pratincole, Glareola maldivarum
Small pratincole, Glareola lactea

Skuas and jaegers
Order: CharadriiformesFamily: Stercorariidae

The family Stercorariidae are, in general, medium to large birds, typically with grey or brown plumage, often with white markings on the wings. They nest on the ground in temperate and arctic regions and are long-distance migrants.

Pomarine jaeger, Stercorarius pomarinus (A)
Parasitic jaeger, Stercorarius parasiticus
Long-tailed jaeger, Stercorarius longicaudus (A)

Gulls, terns, and skimmers
Order: CharadriiformesFamily: Laridae

Laridae is a family of medium to large seabirds, the gulls, terns, and skimmers. They are typically grey or white, often with black markings on the head or wings. They have stout, longish bills and webbed feet. Terns are a group of generally medium to large seabirds typically with grey or white plumage, often with black markings on the head. Most terns hunt fish by diving but some pick insects off the surface of fresh water. Terns are generally long-lived birds, with several species known to live in excess of 30 years. Skimmers are a small family of tropical tern-like birds. They have an elongated lower mandible which they use to feed by flying low over the water surface and skimming the water for small fish.

Tropicbirds
Order: PhaethontiformesFamily: Phaethontidae

Tropicbirds are slender white birds of tropical oceans, with exceptionally long central tail feathers. Their heads and long wings have black markings.

Red-billed tropicbird, Phaethon aethereus (A)
Red-tailed tropicbird, Phaethon rubricauda

Southern storm-petrels

Order: ProcellariiformesFamily: Oceanitidae

The southern storm-petrels are relatives of the petrels and are the smallest seabirds. They feed on planktonic crustaceans and small fish picked from the surface, typically while hovering. The flight is fluttering and sometimes bat-like.

Wilson's storm-petrel, Oceanites oceanicus (A)
Black-bellied storm-petrel, Fregetta tropica (A)

Shearwaters and petrels
Order: ProcellariiformesFamily: Procellariidae

The procellariids are the main group of medium-sized "true petrels", characterised by united nostrils with medium septum and a long outer functional primary.

Wedge-tailed shearwater, Ardenna pacifica (A)
Short-tailed shearwater, Ardenna tenuirostris (A)

Storks
Order: CiconiiformesFamily: Ciconiidae

Storks are large, long-legged, long-necked, wading birds with long, stout bills. Storks are mute, but bill-clattering is an important mode of communication at the nest. Their nests can be large and may be reused for many years. Many species are migratory.

Asian openbill, Anastomus oscitans
Black stork, Ciconia nigra
Asian woolly-necked stork, Ciconia episcopus
White stork, Ciconia ciconia
Oriental stork, Ciconia boyciana
Black-necked stork, Ephippiorhynchus asiaticus
Lesser adjutant, Leptoptilos javanicus
Greater adjutant, Leptoptilos dubius 
Painted stork, Mycteria leucocephala

Frigatebirds
Order: SuliformesFamily: Fregatidae

Frigatebirds are large seabirds usually found over tropical oceans. They are large, black-and-white, or completely black, with long wings and deeply forked tails. The males have coloured inflatable throat pouches. They do not swim or walk and cannot take off from a flat surface. Having the largest wingspan-to-body-weight ratio of any bird, they are essentially aerial, able to stay aloft for more than a week.

Lesser frigatebird, Fregata ariel (A)

Boobies and gannets
Order: SuliformesFamily: Sulidae

The sulids comprise the gannets and boobies. Both groups are medium to large coastal seabirds that plunge-dive for fish.

Masked booby, Sula dactylatra (A)
Red-footed booby, Sula sula (A)

Anhingas
Order: SuliformesFamily: Anhingidae

Anhingas are often called "snake-birds" because of their long thin neck, which gives a snake-like appearance when they swim with their bodies submerged. The males have black and dark-brown plumage, an erectile crest on the nape and a larger bill than the female. The females have much paler plumage especially on the neck and underparts. The darters have completely webbed feet and their legs are short and set far back on the body. Their plumage is somewhat permeable, like that of cormorants, and they spread their wings to dry after diving.

Oriental darter, Anhinga melanogaster

Cormorants and shags
Order: SuliformesFamily: Phalacrocoracidae

Phalacrocoracidae is a family of medium to large coastal, fish-eating seabirds that includes cormorants and shags. Plumage colouration varies, with the majority having mainly dark plumage, some species being black-and-white and a few being colourful.

Little cormorant, Microcarbo niger
Great cormorant, Phalacrocorax carbo
Indian cormorant, Phalacrocorax fuscicollis

Pelicans
Order: PelecaniformesFamily: Pelecanidae

Pelicans are large water birds with a distinctive pouch under their beak. As with other members of the order Pelecaniformes, they have webbed feet with four toes.

Great white pelican, Pelecanus onocrotalus
Spot-billed pelican, Pelecanus philippensis
Dalmatian pelican, Pelecanus crispus (A) (Ex?)

Herons, egrets, and bitterns
Order: PelecaniformesFamily: Ardeidae

The family Ardeidae contains the bitterns, herons and egrets. Herons and egrets are medium to large wading birds with long necks and legs. Bitterns tend to be shorter necked and more wary. Members of Ardeidae fly with their necks retracted, unlike other long-necked birds such as storks, ibises and spoonbills. (Note: in Bangla short-legged, short beaked herons and egrets are called bok, all other herons egrets and storks are generically called sarosh)

Ibises and spoonbills
Order: PelecaniformesFamily: Threskiornithidae

Threskiornithidae is a family of large terrestrial and wading birds which includes the ibises and spoonbills. They have long, broad wings with 11 primary and about 20 secondary feathers. They are strong fliers and despite their size and weight, very capable soarers.

Glossy ibis, Plegadis falcinellus (A)
Black-headed ibis, Threskiornis melanocephalus
Red-naped ibis, Pseudibis papillosa
Eurasian spoonbill, Platalea leucorodia

Osprey
Order: AccipitriformesFamily: Pandionidae

The family Pandionidae contains only one species, the osprey. The osprey is a medium-large raptor which is a specialist fish-eater with a worldwide distribution.

Osprey, Pandion haliaetus

Hawks, eagles, and kites
Order: AccipitriformesFamily: Accipitridae

Accipitridae is a family of birds of prey, which includes hawks, eagles, kites, harriers and Old World vultures. These birds have powerful hooked beaks for tearing flesh from their prey, strong legs, powerful talons and keen eyesight.

Barn owls
Order: StrigiformesFamily: Tytonidae

Barn owls are medium to large owls with large heads and characteristic heart-shaped faces. They have long strong legs with powerful talons.

Australasian grass-owl, Tyto longimembris
Barn owl, Tyto alba

Owls
Order: StrigiformesFamily: Strigidae

The typical owls are small to large solitary nocturnal birds of prey. They have large forward-facing eyes and ears, a hawk-like beak and a conspicuous circle of feathers around each eye called a facial disk.

Trogons
Order: TrogoniformesFamily: Trogonidae

The family Trogonidae includes trogons and quetzals. Found in tropical woodlands worldwide, they feed on insects and fruit, and their broad bills and weak legs reflect their diet and arboreal habits. Although their flight is fast, they are reluctant to fly any distance. Trogons have soft, often colourful, feathers with distinctive male and female plumage.

Red-headed trogon, Harpactes erythrocephalus

Hoopoes
Order: BucerotiformesFamily: Upupidae

Hoopoes have black, white and orangey-pink colouring with a large erectile crest on their head.

Eurasian hoopoe, Upupa epops

Hornbills
Order: BucerotiformesFamily: Bucerotidae

Hornbills are a group of birds whose bill is shaped like a cow's horn, but without a twist, sometimes with a casque on the upper mandible. Frequently, the bill is brightly coloured.

Great hornbill, Buceros bicornis
Indian gray hornbill, Ocyceros birostris (Ex)
Oriental pied-hornbill, Anthracoceros albirostris
Rufous-necked hornbill, Aceros nipalensis
Wreathed hornbill, Rhyticeros undulatus (A)

Kingfishers
Order: CoraciiformesFamily: Alcedinidae

Kingfishers are medium-sized birds with large heads, long, pointed bills, short legs, and stubby tails.

Blyth's kingfisher, Alcedo hercules (A)
Common kingfisher, Alcedo atthis
Blue-eared kingfisher, Alcedo meninting
Black-backed dwarf-kingfisher, Ceyx erithacus
Brown-winged kingfisher, Pelargopsis amauropterus
Stork-billed kingfisher, Pelargopsis capensis
Ruddy kingfisher, Halcyon coromanda
White-throated kingfisher, Halcyon smyrnensis
Black-capped kingfisher, Halcyon pileata
Collared kingfisher, Todirhamphus chloris
Crested kingfisher, Megaceryle lugubris
Pied kingfisher, Ceryle rudis

Bee-eaters
Order: CoraciiformesFamily: Meropidae

The bee-eaters are a group of near passerine birds in the family Meropidae. Most species are found in Africa but others occur in southern Europe, Madagascar, Australia and New Guinea. They are characterised by richly coloured plumage, slender bodies and usually elongated central tail feathers. All are colourful and have long downturned bills and pointed wings, which give them a swallow-like appearance when seen from afar.

Blue-bearded bee-eater, Nyctyornis athertoni
Asian green bee-eater, Merops orientalis
Blue-tailed bee-eater, Merops philippinus
Chestnut-headed bee-eater, Merops leschenaulti

Rollers
Order: CoraciiformesFamily: Coraciidae

Rollers resemble crows in size and build, but are more closely related to the kingfishers and bee-eaters. They share the colourful appearance of those groups with blues and browns predominating. The two inner front toes are connected, but the outer toe is not.

Indian roller, Coracias benghalensis
Indochinese roller, Coracias affinis
Dollarbird, Eurystomus orientalis

Asian barbets
Order: PiciformesFamily: Megalaimidae

The Asian barbets are plump birds, with short necks and large heads. They get their name from the bristles which fringe their heavy bills. Most species are brightly coloured.

Coppersmith barbet, Psilopogon haemacephalus
Blue-eared barbet, Psilopogon duvaucelii
Great barbet, Psilopogon virens
Lineated barbet, Psilopogon lineatus
Brown-headed barbet, Psilopogon zeylanicus
Golden-throated barbet, Psilopogon franklinii
Blue-throated barbet, Psilopogon asiaticus

Woodpeckers
Order: PiciformesFamily: Picidae

Woodpeckers are small to medium-sized birds with chisel-like beaks, short legs, stiff tails and long tongues used for capturing insects. Some species have feet with two toes pointing forward and two backward, while several species have only three toes. Many woodpeckers have the habit of tapping noisily on tree trunks with their beaks.

Falcons and caracaras
Order: FalconiformesFamily: Falconidae

Falconidae is a family of diurnal birds of prey. They differ from hawks, eagles and kites in that they kill with their beaks instead of their talons.

Old World parrots
Order: PsittaciformesFamily: Psittaculidae

Characteristic features of parrots include a strong curved bill, an upright stance, strong legs, and clawed zygodactyl feet. Many parrots are vividly coloured, and some are multi-coloured. Old World parrots are found from Africa east across south and southeast Asia and Oceania to Australia and New Zealand.

Alexandrine parakeet, Psittacula eupatria
Rose-ringed parakeet, Psittacula krameri (I)
Gray-headed parakeet, Psittacula finschii
Plum-headed parakeet, Psittacula cyanocephala
Blossom-headed parakeet, Psittacula roseata
Red-breasted parakeet, Psittacula alexandri
Vernal hanging-parrot, Loriculus vernalis

Asian and Grauer’s broadbills
Order: PasseriformesFamily: Eurylaimidae

The broadbills are small, brightly coloured birds, which feed on fruit and also take insects in flycatcher fashion, snapping their broad bills. Their habitat is canopies of wet forests.

Long-tailed broadbill, Psarisomus dalhousiae
Silver-breasted broadbill, Serilophus lunatus

Pittas
Order: PasseriformesFamily: Pittidae

Pittas are medium-sized by passerine standards and are stocky, with fairly long, strong legs, short tails and stout bills. Many are brightly coloured. They spend the majority of their time on wet forest floors, eating snails, insects and similar invertebrates.

Blue-naped pitta, Hydrornis nipalensis
Blue pitta, Hydrornis cyanea
Indian pitta, Pitta brachyura
Hooded pitta, Pitta sordida
Mangrove pitta, Pitta megarhyncha

Cuckooshrikes
Order: PasseriformesFamily: Campephagidae

The cuckooshrikes are small to medium-sized passerine birds. They are predominantly greyish with white and black, although some species are brightly coloured.

White-bellied minivet, Pericrocotus erythropygius
Small minivet, Pericrocotus cinnamomeus
Gray-chinned minivet, Pericrocotus solaris
Short-billed minivet, Pericrocotus brevirostris
Long-tailed minivet, Pericrocotus ethologus
Scarlet minivet, Pericrocotus flammeus
Ashy minivet, Pericrocotus divaricatus (A)
Brown-rumped minivet, Pericrocotus cantonensis
Rosy minivet, Pericrocotus roseus
Large cuckooshrike, Coracina macei
Black-winged cuckooshrike, Lalage melaschistos
Black-headed cuckooshrike, Lalage melanoptera

Vireos, shrike-babblers, and erpornis
Order: PasseriformesFamily: Vireonidae

Most of the members of this family are found in the New World. However, the shrike-babblers and erpornis, which only slightly resemble the "true" vireos and greenlets, are found in South East Asia.

Black-eared shrike-babbler, Pteruthius melanotis
White-bellied erpornis, Erpornis zantholeuca

Whistlers and allies
Order: PasseriformesFamily: Pachycephalidae

The family Pachycephalidae includes the whistlers, shrikethrushes, and some of the pitohuis.

Mangrove whistler, Pachycephala cinerea

Old World orioles
Order: PasseriformesFamily: Oriolidae

The Old World orioles are colourful passerine birds. They are not related to the New World orioles.

Indian golden oriole, Oriolus kundoo
Black-naped oriole, Oriolus chinensis
Slender-billed oriole, Oriolus tenuirostris (A)
Black-hooded oriole, Oriolus xanthornus
Maroon oriole, Oriolus traillii

Woodswallows, bellmagpies, and allies
Order: PasseriformesFamily: Artamidae

The woodswallows are soft-plumaged, somber-coloured passerine birds. They are smooth, agile flyers with moderately large, semi-triangular wings.

Ashy woodswallow, Artamus fuscus

Vangas, helmetshrikes, and allies
Order: PasseriformesFamily: Vangidae

The family Vangidae is highly variable, though most members of it resemble true shrikes to some degree.

Large woodshrike, Tephrodornis gularis
Common woodshrike, Tephrodornis pondicerianus
Bar-winged flycatcher-shrike, Hemipus picatus

Ioras
Order: PasseriformesFamily: Aegithinidae

The ioras are bulbul-like birds of open forest or thorn scrub, but whereas that group tends to be drab in colouration, ioras are sexually dimorphic, with the males being brightly plumaged in yellows and greens.

Common iora, Aegithina tiphia
White-tailed iora, Aegithina nigrolutea

Fantails
Order: PasseriformesFamily: Rhipiduridae

The fantails are small insectivorous birds which are specialist aerial feeders.

White-throated fantail, Rhipidura albicollis
White-browed fantail, Rhipidura aureola

Drongos
Order: PasseriformesFamily: Dicruridae

The drongos are mostly black or dark grey in colour, sometimes with metallic tints. They have long forked tails, and some Asian species have elaborate tail decorations. They have short legs and sit very upright when perched, like a shrike. They flycatch or take prey from the ground.

Black drongo, Dicrurus macrocercus
Ashy drongo, Dicrurus leucophaeus
White-bellied drongo, Dicrurus caerulescens
Crow-billed drongo, Dicrurus annectens
Bronzed drongo, Dicrurus aeneus
Lesser racket-tailed drongo, Dicrurus remifer
Hair-crested drongo, Dicrurus hottentottus
Greater racket-tailed drongo, Dicrurus paradiseus

Monarch flycatchers
Order: PasseriformesFamily: Monarchidae

The monarch flycatchers are small to medium-sized insectivorous passerines which hunt by flycatching.

Black-naped monarch, Hypothymis azurea
Amur paradise-flycatcher, Terpsiphone incei (A)
Blyth's paradise-flycatcher, Terpsiphone affinis
Indian paradise-flycatcher, Terpsiphone paradisi

Shrikes
Order: PasseriformesFamily: Laniidae

Shrikes are passerine birds known for their habit of catching other birds and small animals and impaling the uneaten portions of their bodies on thorns. A typical shrike's beak is hooked, like a bird of prey.

Isabelline shrike, Lanius isabellinus (A)
Brown shrike, Lanius cristatus
Burmese shrike, Lanius collurioides (A)
Bay-backed shrike, Lanius vittatus
Long-tailed shrike, Lanius schach
Gray-backed shrike, Lanius tephronotus
Great gray shrike, Lanius excubitor

Crows, jays, and magpies
Order: PasseriformesFamily: Corvidae

The family Corvidae includes crows, ravens, jays, choughs, magpies, treepies, nutcrackers and ground jays. Corvids are above average in size among the Passeriformes, and some of the larger species show high levels of intelligence.

Eurasian jay, Garrulus glandarius
Red-billed blue-magpie, Urocissa erythrorhyncha
Common green-magpie, Cissa chinensis
Rufous treepie, Dendrocitta vagabunda
Gray treepie, Dendrocitta formosae
Collared treepie, Dendrocitta frontalis
House crow, Corvus splendens
Large-billed crow, Corvus macrorhynchos

Fairy flycatchers
Order: PasseriformesFamily: Stenostiridae

Most of the species of this small family are found in Africa, though a few inhabit tropical Asia. They are not closely related to other birds called "flycatchers".

Yellow-bellied fairy-fantail, Chelidorhynx hypoxanthus
Gray-headed canary-flycatcher, Culicicapa ceylonensis

Tits, chickadees, and titmice
Order: PasseriformesFamily: Paridae

The Paridae are mainly small stocky woodland species with short stout bills. Some have crests. They are adaptable birds, with a mixed diet including seeds and insects.

Sultan tit, Melanochlora sultanea
Green-backed tit, Parus monticolus (A)
Cinereous tit, Parus cinereus
Yellow-cheeked tit, Parus spilonotus

Larks
Order: PasseriformesFamily: Alaudidae

Larks are small terrestrial birds with often extravagant songs and display flights. Most larks are fairly dull in appearance. Their food is insects and seeds.

Ashy-crowned sparrow-lark, Eremopterix griseus
Horsfield’s bushlark, Mirafra javanica
Bengal bushlark, Mirafra assamica
Greater short-toed lark, Calandrella brachydactyla (A)
Mongolian short-toed lark, Calandrella dukhunensis
Hume's lark, Calandrella acutirostris
Sand lark, Alaudala raytal
Oriental skylark, Alauda gulgula

Cisticolas and allies
Order: PasseriformesFamily: Cisticolidae

The Cisticolidae are warblers found mainly in warmer southern regions of the Old World. They are generally very small birds of drab brown or grey appearance found in open country such as grassland or scrub.

Common tailorbird, Orthotomus sutorius
Dark-necked tailorbird, Orthotomus atrogularis
Himalayan prinia, Prinia crinigera
Black-throated prinia, Prinia atrogularis
Rufous-fronted prinia, Prinia buchanani (A)
Rufescent prinia, Prinia rufescens
Gray-breasted prinia, Prinia hodgsonii
Delicate prinia, Prinia lepida
Jungle prinia, Prinia sylvatica
Yellow-bellied prinia, Prinia flaviventris
Ashy prinia, Prinia socialis
Plain prinia, Prinia inornata
Zitting cisticola, Cisticola juncidis
Golden-headed cisticola, Cisticola exilis

Reed warblers and allies 
Order: PasseriformesFamily: Acrocephalidae

The members of this family are usually rather large for "warblers". Most are rather plain olivaceous brown above with much yellow to beige below. They are usually found in open woodland, reedbeds, or tall grass. The family occurs mostly in southern to western Eurasia and surroundings, but it also ranges far into the Pacific, with some species in Africa.

Thick-billed warbler, Arundinax aedon
Booted warbler, Iduna caligata
Sykes's warbler, Iduna rama (A)
Black-browed reed warbler, Acrocephalus bistrigiceps
Paddyfield warbler, Acrocephalus agricola
Blunt-winged warbler, Acrocephalus concinens
Blyth's reed warbler, Acrocephalus dumetorum
Large-billed reed warbler, Acrocephalus orinus (A)
Oriental reed warbler, Acrocephalus orientalis
Clamorous reed warbler, Acrocephalus stentoreus

Grassbirds and allies
Order: PasseriformesFamily: Locustellidae

Locustellidae are a family of small insectivorous songbirds found mainly in Eurasia, Africa, and the Australian region. They are smallish birds with tails that are usually long and pointed, and tend to be drab brownish or buffy all over.

Striated grassbird, Megalurus palustris
Pallas's grasshopper warbler, Helopsaltes certhiola
Lanceolated warbler, Locustella lanceolata (A)
Brown bush warbler, Locustella luteoventris (A)
Common grasshopper-warbler, Locustella naevia (A)
Baikal bush warbler, Locustella davidi (A)
Spotted bush warbler, Locustella thoracica (A)
Russet bush warbler, Locustella mandelli
Bristled grassbird, Schoenicola striatus

Cupwings
Order: PasseriformesFamily: Pnoepygidae

The members of this small family are found in mountainous parts of South and South East Asia.

Pygmy cupwing, Pnoepyga pusilla (A)

Swallows
Order: PasseriformesFamily: Hirundinidae

The family Hirundinidae is adapted to aerial feeding. They have a slender streamlined body, long pointed wings and a short bill with a wide gape. The feet are adapted to perching rather than walking, and the front toes are partially joined at the base.

Gray-throated martin, Riparia chinensis
Bank swallow, Riparia riparia
Pale sand martin, Riparia diluta (A)
Dusky crag-martin, Ptyonoprogne concolor
Barn swallow, Hirundo rustica
Wire-tailed swallow, Hirundo smithii
Red-rumped swallow, Cecropis daurica
Striated swallow, Cecropis striolata
Streak-throated swallow, Petrochelidon fluvicola (A)
Common house-martin, Delichon urbicum
Asian house-martin, Delichon dasypus (A)
Nepal house-martin, Delichon nipalense

Bulbuls
Order: PasseriformesFamily: Pycnonotidae

Bulbuls are medium-sized songbirds. Some are colourful with yellow, red or orange vents, cheeks, throats or supercilia, but most are drab, with uniform olive-brown to black plumage. Some species have distinct crests.

Black-headed bulbul, Brachypodius melanocephalos
Black-crested bulbul, Rubigula flaviventris
Crested finchbill, Spizixos canifrons
Red-vented bulbul, Pycnonotus cafer
Red-whiskered bulbul, Pycnonotus jocosus
Flavescent bulbul, Pycnonotus flavescens
White-browed bulbul, Pycnonotus luteolus
White-throated bulbul, Alophoixus flaveolus
Cachar bulbul, Iole cacharensis
Black bulbul, Hypsipetes leucocephalus
Ashy bulbul, Hemixos flavala
Mountain bulbul, Ixos mcclellandii

Leaf warblers
Order: PasseriformesFamily: Phylloscopidae

Leaf warblers are a family of small insectivorous birds found mostly in Eurasia and ranging into Wallacea and Africa. The species are of various sizes, often green-plumaged above and yellow below, or more subdued with greyish-green to greyish-brown colours.

Bush warblers and allies
Order: PasseriformesFamily: Scotocercidae

The members of this family are found throughout Africa, Asia, and Polynesia. Their taxonomy is in flux, and some authorities place some genera in other families.

Asian stubtail, Urosphena squameiceps (A)
Gray-bellied tesia, Tesia cyaniventer
Slaty-bellied tesia, Tesia olivea (A)
Chestnut-crowned bush warbler, Cettia major (A)
Gray-sided bush warbler, Cettia brunnifrons (A)
Chestnut-headed tesia, Cettia castaneocoronata (A)
Yellow-bellied warbler, Abroscopus superciliaris
Rufous-faced warbler, Abroscopus albogularis
Mountain tailorbird, Phyllergates cucullatus
Brownish-flanked bush warbler, Horornis fortipes
Aberrant bush warbler, Horornis flavolivaceus (A)

Sylviid warblers, parrotbills, and allies
Order: PasseriformesFamily: Sylviidae

The family Sylviidae is a group of small insectivorous passerine birds. They mainly occur as breeding species, as the common name implies, in Europe, Asia and, to a lesser extent, Africa. Most are of generally undistinguished appearance, but many have distinctive songs.

Lesser whitethroat, Curruca curruca (A)
Eastern Orphean warbler, Curruca crassirostris
Yellow-eyed babbler, Chrysomma sinense
Jerdon's babbler, Chrysomma altirostre
Gray-headed parrotbill, Psittiparus gularis
Rufous-headed parrotbill, Psittiparus bakeri
Black-breasted parrotbill, Paradoxornis flavirostris
Spot-breasted parrotbill, Paradoxornis guttaticollis
Pale-billed parrotbill, Chleuasicus atrosuperciliaris

White-eyes, yuhinas, and allies
Order: PasseriformesFamily: Zosteropidae

The white-eyes are small birds of rather drab appearance, the plumage above being typically greenish-olive, but some species have a white or bright yellow throat, breast, or lower parts, and several have buff flanks. As the name suggests, many species have a white ring around each eye.

Striated yuhina, Staphida castaniceps
White-naped yuhina, Yuhina bakeri
Whiskered yuhina, Yuhina flavicollis
Stripe-throated yuhina, Yuhina gularis
Black-chinned yuhina, Yuhina nigrimenta
Indian white-eye, Zosterops palpebrosus

Tree-babblers, scimitar-babblers, and allies
Order: PasseriformesFamily: Timaliidae

The babblers, or timaliids, are somewhat diverse in size and colouration, but are characterised by soft fluffy plumage.

Chestnut-capped babbler, Timalia pileata
Pin-striped tit-babbler, Mixornis gularis
Tawny-bellied babbler, Dumetia hyperythra
Golden babbler, Cyanoderma chrysaeum
Buff-chested babbler, Cyanoderma ambiguum
Red-billed scimitar-babbler, Pomatorhinus ochraceiceps
Slender-billed scimitar-babbler, Pomatorhinus superciliaris
Streak-breasted scimitar-babbler, Pomatorhinus ruficollis
White-browed scimitar-babbler, Pomatorhinus schisticeps
Large scimitar-babbler, Erythrogenys hypoleucos
Rusty-cheeked scimitar-babbler, Erythrogenys erythrogenys
Gray-throated babbler, Stachyris nigriceps

Ground babblers and allies
Order: PasseriformesFamily: Pellorneidae

These small to medium-sized songbirds have soft fluffy plumage but are otherwise rather diverse. Members of the genus Illadopsis are found in forests, but some other genera are birds of scrublands.

White-hooded babbler, Gampsorhynchus rufulus
Yellow-throated fulvetta, Schoeniparus cinereus
Rufous-winged fulvetta, Schoeniparus castaneceps
Rufous-throated fulvetta, Schoeniparus rufogularis
Rufous-vented grass babbler, Laticilla burnesii
Swamp grass babbler, Laticilla cinerascens
Puff-throated babbler, Pellorneum ruficeps
Marsh babbler, Pellorneum palustre
Spot-throated babbler, Pellorneum albiventre
Buff-breasted babbler, Pellorneum tickelli
Long-billed wren-babbler, Napothera malacoptila
Abbott's babbler, Malacocincla abbotti
Streaked wren-babbler, Turdinus brevicaudatus (A)
Indian grassbird, Graminicola bengalensis

Laughingthrushes and allies
Order: PasseriformesFamily: Leiothrichidae

The members of this family are diverse in size and colouration, though those of genus Turdoides tend to be brown or greyish. The family is found in Africa, India, and southeast Asia.

Nuthatches
Order: PasseriformesFamily: Sittidae

Nuthatches are small woodland birds. They have the unusual ability to climb down trees head first, unlike other birds which can only go upwards. Nuthatches have big heads, short tails and powerful bills and feet.

Indian nuthatch, Sitta castanea
Chestnut-bellied nuthatch, Sitta cinnamoventris
Chestnut-vented nuthatch, Sitta nagaensis
Velvet-fronted nuthatch, Sitta frontalis

Treecreepers
Order: PasseriformesFamily: Certhiidae

Treecreepers are small woodland birds, brown above and white below. They have thin pointed down-curved bills, which they use to extricate insects from bark. They have stiff tail feathers, like woodpeckers, which they use to support themselves on vertical trees.

Bar-tailed treecreeper, Certhia himalayana

Wrens
Order: PasseriformesFamily: Troglodytidae

The wrens are mainly small and inconspicuous except for their loud songs. These birds have short wings and thin down-turned bills. Several species often hold their tails upright. All are insectivorous.

Eurasian wren, Troglodytes troglodytes

Spotted elachura
Order: PasseriformesFamily: Elachuridae

This species, the only one in its family, inhabits forest undergrowth throughout South East Asia.

Spotted elachura, Elachura formosa

Dippers
Order: PasseriformesFamily: Cinclidae

Dippers are a group of perching birds whose habitat includes aquatic environments in the Americas, Europe and Asia. They are named for their bobbing or dipping movements.

Brown dipper, Cinclus pallasii

Starlings
Order: PasseriformesFamily: Sturnidae

Starlings are small to medium-sized passerine birds. Their flight is strong and direct and they are very gregarious. Their preferred habitat is fairly open country. They eat insects and fruit. Plumage is typically dark with a metallic sheen.

Thrushes and allies
Order: PasseriformesFamily: Turdidae

The thrushes are a group of passerine birds that occur mainly in the Old World. They are plump, soft plumaged, small to medium-sized insectivores or sometimes omnivores, often feeding on the ground. Many have attractive songs.

Old World flycatchers
Order: PasseriformesFamily: Muscicapidae

Old World flycatchers are a large group of small passerine birds native to the Old World. They are mainly small arboreal insectivores. The appearance of these birds is highly varied, but they mostly have weak songs and harsh calls.

Flowerpeckers
Order: PasseriformesFamily: Dicaeidae

The flowerpeckers are very small, stout, often brightly coloured birds, with short tails, short thick curved bills and tubular tongues.

Thick-billed flowerpecker, Dicaeum agile
Yellow-vented flowerpecker, Dicaeum chrysorrheum
Yellow-bellied flowerpecker, Dicaeum melanozanthum (A)
Orange-bellied flowerpecker, Dicaeum trigonostigma
Pale-billed flowerpecker, Dicaeum erythrorhynchos
Plain flowerpecker, Dicaeum minullum
Fire-breasted flowerpecker, Dicaeum ignipectus (A)
Scarlet-backed flowerpecker, Dicaeum cruentatum

Sunbirds and spiderhunters

Order: PasseriformesFamily: Nectariniidae

The sunbirds and spiderhunters are very small passerine birds which feed largely on nectar, although they will also take insects, especially when feeding young. Flight is fast and direct on their short wings. Most species can take nectar by hovering like a hummingbird, but usually perch to feed.

Ruby-cheeked sunbird, Chalcoparia singalensis
Purple-rumped sunbird, Leptocoma zeylonica
Van Hasselt's sunbird, Leptocoma brasiliana
Purple sunbird, Cinnyris asiaticus
Olive-backed sunbird, Cinnyris jugularis (A)
Fire-tailed sunbird, Aethopyga ignicauda (A)
Black-throated sunbird, Aethopyga saturata
Mrs. Gould's sunbird, Aethopyga gouldiae (A)
Green-tailed sunbird, Aethopyga nipalensis
Crimson sunbird, Aethopyga siparaja
Fire-tailed sunbird, Aethopyga ignicauda
Little spiderhunter, Arachnothera longirostra
Streaked spiderhunter, Arachnothera magna

Fairy-bluebirds
Order: PasseriformesFamily: Irenidae

The fairy-bluebirds are bulbul-like birds of open forest or thorn scrub. The males are dark-blue and the females a duller green.

Asian fairy-bluebird, Irena puella

Leafbirds
Order: PasseriformesFamily: Chloropseidae

The leafbirds are small, bulbul-like birds. The males are brightly plumaged, usually in greens and yellows.

Blue-winged leafbird, Chloropsis cochinchinensis
Jerdon's leafbird, Chloropsis jerdoni (A)
Golden-fronted leafbird, Chloropsis aurifrons
Orange-bellied leafbird, Chloropsis hardwickii

Weavers and allies
Order: PasseriformesFamily: Ploceidae

The weavers are small passerine birds related to the finches. They are seed-eating birds with rounded conical bills. The males of many species are brightly coloured, usually in red or yellow and black, some species show variation in colour only in the breeding season.

Streaked weaver, Ploceus manyar
Baya weaver, Ploceus philippinus
Black-breasted weaver, Ploceus benghalensis

Waxbills and allies
Order: PasseriformesFamily: Estrildidae

The estrildid finches are small passerine birds of the Old World tropics and Australasia. They are gregarious and often colonial seed eaters with short thick but pointed bills. They are all similar in structure and habits, but have wide variation in plumage colours and patterns.

Red avadavat, Amandava amandava
Indian silverbill, Euodice malabarica
White-rumped munia, Lonchura striata
Scaly-breasted munia, Lonchura punctulata
Tricolored munia, Lonchura malacca
Chestnut munia, Lonchura atricapilla

Old World sparrows
Order: PasseriformesFamily: Passeridae

Old World sparrows are small passerine birds. In general, sparrows tend to be small, plump, brown or grey birds with short tails and short powerful beaks. Sparrows are seed eaters, but they also consume small insects.

House sparrow, Passer domesticus
Eurasian tree sparrow, Passer montanus

Wagtails and pipits
Order: PasseriformesFamily: Motacillidae

Motacillidae is a family of small passerine birds with medium to long tails. They include the wagtails, longclaws and pipits. They are slender, ground feeding insectivores of open country.

Forest wagtail, Dendronanthus indicus
Gray wagtail, Motacilla cinerea
Western yellow wagtail, Motacilla flava
Eastern yellow wagtail, Motacilla tschutschensis
Citrine wagtail, Motacilla citreola
White-browed wagtail, Motacilla maderaspatensis
White wagtail, Motacilla alba
Richard's pipit, Anthus richardi
Paddyfield pipit, Anthus rufulus
Long-billed pipit, Anthus similis
Blyth's pipit, Anthus godlewskii
Tawny pipit, Anthus campestris
Rosy pipit, Anthus roseatus
Tree pipit, Anthus trivialis
Olive-backed pipit, Anthus hodgsoni
Red-throated pipit, Anthus cervinus (A)
Water pipit, Anthus spinoletta

Finches, euphonias, and allies
Order: PasseriformesFamily: Fringillidae

Finches are seed-eating passerine birds, that are small to moderately large and have a strong beak, usually conical and in some species very large. All have twelve tail feathers and nine primaries. These birds have a bouncing flight with alternating bouts of flapping and gliding on closed wings, and most sing well.

Common rosefinch, Carpodacus erythrinus (A)
Scarlet finch, Haematospiza sipahi

Old World buntings
Order: PasseriformesFamily: Emberizidae

The emberizids are a large family of passerine birds. They are seed-eating birds with distinctively shaped bills. Many emberizid species have distinctive head patterns.

Crested bunting, Emberiza lathami
Black-headed bunting, Emberiza melanocephala (A)
Red-headed bunting, Emberiza bruniceps
Chestnut-eared bunting, Emberiza fucata
Gray-necked bunting, Emberiza buchanani (A)
Yellow-breasted bunting, Emberiza aureola
Little bunting, Emberiza pusilla (A)
Black-faced bunting, Emberiza spodocephala
Tristram's bunting, Emberiza tristrami (A)

See also
List of birds
Lists of birds by region

References

External links
Birds of Bangladesh. Photo Memoirs.
Birds of Bangladesh. Amar Kotha.

Bangladesh
Bangladesh
'
birds